The Daniel McMahan House is a property in Franklin, Tennessee, United States, that dates from c. 1800 and that was listed on the National Register of Historic Places in 1988.

It includes Central passage plan and other architecture.

Daniel McMahan was one of the early settlers of the region.  His house is one of five log buildings built during 1798 to 1800, during the earliest settling of the area, which survive to today.  Others, also NRHP-listed, are: the David McEwen House, the Andrew Crockett House, the William Ogilvie House, and the William Boyd House.

References

Central-passage houses in Tennessee
Houses completed in 1800
Houses on the National Register of Historic Places in Tennessee
Houses in Franklin, Tennessee
National Register of Historic Places in Williamson County, Tennessee